Elena Zareschi (23 July 1916 – 31 July 1999) was an Italian stage, television and film actress.

Life and career 
Born Elina Lazzareschi in Buenos Aires to Italian parents from Lucca, Zareschi moved to Rome in the mid-1930s and enrolled at the Centro Sperimentale di Cinematografia, graduating in 1937. In the same year, she made her film debut in the drama L’ultima nemica. While she had few opportunities in films, Zareschi was very active on stage, where she debuted in 1939, as well as in television films and series.

Partial filmography

 Everybody's Woman (1934)
 The Last Enemy (1938)
 Ultima giovinezza (1939) – Yvonne
 Sei bambine ed il Perseo (1940) – Vivalda
 L'ultima nemica (1940) – Isa Fleur
 Merchant of Slaves (1942) – Francesca
 M.A.S. (1942) – L'attrice, amica di Brera
 Don Giovanni (1942) – Elvira
 Jealousy (1942) – Zosima Munoz
 Rita of Cascia (1943) – Rita da Cascia
 Peccatori (1945)
 I contrabbandieri del mare (1948) – Stella
 The Earth Cries Out (1949) – Ada
 Shadows on the Grand Canal (1951)
 Ulysses (1954) – Cassandra
 Il conte Aquila (1955) – Imperatrice Austriaca
 The Mysteries of Paris (1957) – Matilde
 Herod the Great (1959) – Alexandra
 Le sorprese dell'amore (1959) – Carlotta
 The Cossacks (1960) – Patima
 The Warrior Empress (1960) – Sibilla
 Silver Spoon Set (1960) – Actress (uncredited)
 Minotaur, the Wild Beast of Crete (1960) – Queen Pasifae
 Invasion 1700 (1962) – Princess Kinzevich
 Un colpo al cuore (1970)
 La lunga ombra del lupo (1971) – Countess Balestrieri

References

Further reading

External links 

Actresses from Buenos Aires
Italian stage actresses
Italian film actresses
Italian television actresses
1916 births
1999 deaths
20th-century Italian actresses